Ellsworth Jerome Hill (1833 in Le Roy, New York – 1917) was a Presbyterian minister and an American botanist. He conducted identifications and classifications of new American species.

References

American botanists
People from Le Roy, New York
1833 births
1917 deaths
American Presbyterian ministers
Scientists from New York (state)